Ptocheuusa minimella is a moth of the family Gelechiidae. It was described by Hans Rebel in 1936. It is found in Italy, Croatia and on Sardinia and Cyprus.

The wingspan is 8–10 mm. The forewings are yellowish bone-colour, sprinkled with brown at the margins. The hindwings are light grey.

References

Moths described in 1936
Ptocheuusa